Anton Mikhailavich Prylepau or Prilepov (born 5 February 1984 in Mogilev) is an athlete from Belarus. He competes in archery.

Prylepau competed at the 2004 Summer Olympics in men's individual archery. He won his first match, advancing to the round of 32. In the second round of elimination, he was again victorious and advanced to the round of 16. The third match was Prylepau's downfall, as he lost to Park Kyung-mo of Korea. Prylepau placed 9th overall.

References

1984 births
Living people
Belarusian male archers
Olympic archers of Belarus
Archers at the 2004 Summer Olympics
Archers at the 2016 Summer Olympics
Archers at the 2015 European Games
European Games medalists in archery
European Games bronze medalists for Belarus
People from Mogilev
Sportspeople from Mogilev Region